This is a list of named craters in the Solar System as named by IAU's Working Group for Planetary System Nomenclature. As of 2017, there is a total of 5,223 craters on 40 astronomical bodies, which includes minor planets (asteroids and dwarf planets), planets, and natural satellites. All geological features of a body (including craters) are typically named after a specific theme.



Amalthea (2)

Ariel (17) 

back to top

Callisto (141) 

back to top

Ceres (90) 

back to top

Charon (6)

back to top

Dactyl (2) 

back to top

Deimos (2) 

back to top

Dione (73) 

back to top

Earth (190)

Enceladus (53) 

back to top

Epimetheus (2) 

back to top

Eros (37) 

back to top

Europa (41) 

back to top

Ganymede (131) 

back to top

Dropped or not approved names 

back to top

Gaspra (31) 

back to top

Hyperion (4)

Iapetus (58) 

back to top

Ida (21)

Itokawa (10) 

back to top

Janus (4) 

back to top

Lutetia (19) 

back to top

Mars (1092)

Mathilde (23)

Mercury (397)

Mimas (35) 

back to top

Miranda (7) 

back to top

Moon (1624)

Oberon (9) 

back to top

Phobos (17) 

back to top

Phoebe (24) 

back to top

Pluto (2) 

back to top

Proteus (1)

Puck (3) 

back to top

Rhea (128)

Steins (23)

Tethys (50) 

back to top

Thebe (1) 

back to top

Titan (11) 

back to top

Titania (15) 

back to top

Triton (9) 

back to top

Umbriel (13) 

back to top

Venus (900)

Vesta (90) 

back to top

See also 
 List of largest craters in the Solar System

References

External links 
 Gazetteer of Planetary Nomenclature, International Astronomical Union (IAU) Working Group for Planetary System Nomenclature (WGPSN)